Aimé-Victor-François Guilbert (15 November 1812 – 16 August 1889) was a French prelate of the Catholic Church who became a bishop in 1867. He was Bishop of Gap from 1867 to 1879, then Bishop of Amiens until 1883, and then Archbishop of Bordeaux until his death. He was raised to the rank of cardinal in 1889.

Biography
Aimé-Victor-François Guilbert was born in Cerisy-la-Forêt on 15 November 1812. He was ordained a priest of the Diocese of Coutances on 17 December 1836. He taught at the minor seminaries in Coutances and Mandeville, then led the minor seminaries in Mortain and Valogne, where he became archpriest in 1855.

He was appointed Bishop of Gap on 20 September 1867 and received his episcopal consecration from François-Augustine Delamare, Archbishop of Auch, on 10 November. At the First Vatican Council he opposed the declaration of the doctrine of papal infallibility; he was atypical of the Church hierarchy in being comfortable reconciling the Church to the modern world.

Pope Leo XIII confirmed his appointment as Bishop of Amiens on 22 September 1879 and then as Archbishop of Bordeaux on 9 August 1883. There he continued his attempts to reconcile the Church to the French Republic and opposed Catholic monarchists, publishing his arguments in 1886 as La démocratie et son avenir social et religieux.

Pope Leo created him a cardinal priest on 24 May 1889.

Guilbert died less than three months later on 16 August 1889 in Gap, where he had consecrated the new bishop, Prosper-Amable Berthet, on 1 August.
He had not visited Rome to receive his red biretta and be assigned his titular church.

References

Additional sources

 Guillaume, P. (1889), "Le cardinal Guilbert," Bulletin de la Société des Etudes des Hautes-Alpes, 1889, pp. 374–377.

External links

1812 births
1889 deaths
People from Manche
19th-century French cardinals
Archbishops of Bordeaux
Bishops of Amiens
Bishops of Gap
Cardinals created by Pope Leo XIII